Take to the Seas are an English four-piece indie rock band from Sheffield, England. They released a two track EP on Favourite Tree Records in March 2009. They have had positive reviews in magazines such as Sandman magazine, and have had airplay on BBC Radio Sheffield's Raw Talent, and on Tom Robinson's radio show on BBC Radio 6 Music.

Formation 
They met in Sheffield, South Yorkshire in late 2008 following guitarist Sam and bassist Joe's time together at school in York, England. All members were in other Sheffield bands at the time, those being Hey! Robot!, Pocket Satellite, and Say Things Twice. They recorded the It's Science E.P. at the Vault Studios in Sheffield which was subsequently released on Favourite Tree Records.

Releases 
2009: It's Science EP

References

External links
Official Website
Official MySpace

Musical groups from Sheffield
English indie rock groups